Kowdoor Sadananda Hegde (11 June 1909 – 24 May 1990) was an Indian jurist and politician who served as a judge in the Supreme Court of India and later as the Speaker of the Lok Sabha.
Hegde founded the Nitte Education Trust. He is the father of Santhosh Hegde, who also served as a judge in the Supreme Court of India.

Political career
Hegde served as a public prosecutor from 1947 to 1951. In 1952, he was elected to the Rajya Sabha, a position which he held until 1957. In 1967, Hegde was appointed a judge in the Supreme Court of India. On 30 April 1973, he tendered his resignation, as a matter of principle, when one of his junior colleagues was appointed the Chief Justice of India.

Thereafter, Hegde once again started taking an active part in socio-political movements. In 1977, he was elected to the Lok Sabha from the Bangalore South constituency on a Janata Party ticket. Several months later, he became Speaker after the resignation of his predecessor, Neelam Sanjiva Reddy. He held the position from 1977 to 1980. Lal Krishna Advani had suggested Hegde's name for Presidentship but Sanjiva Reddy got the nod, and Hegde replaced Reddy as Lok Sabha speaker. Hegde retired from electoral politics after Lok Sabha was dissolved in 1979. He joined BJP when it was founded in 1980 and briefly served as its vice-president. He also established the Nitte Education Trust in 1979 to provide a high school to the village of Nitte. Hegde died on 24 May 1990 at his residence in Mangalore, and left behind his wife Meenakshi and six children, three sons and three daughters.

Legacy
As a judge of the Supreme Court of India, his lordship was also a part of the thirteen judge bench which decided the famous Kesavananda Bharati v. State of Kerala. However, he resigned soon after delivering the majority judgment, as Justice A. N. Ray was appointed the Chief Justice of India, although Hegde was senior judge at the time. In an obituary of Hegde, Justice M. M. Ismail wrote, "His tenure as a Judge of the Supreme Court was notable for his learned judgements which were characterised by basic legal principles and practical common-sense.The end of his judicial career was equally notable for his sense of self-respect and dignity which he attached to his office, as he resigned his office without the slightest hesitation the movement [sic] he heard the news over the all India Radio that he and two senior colleagues of his had been superseded in the appointment of the Chief Justice of the Supreme Court."

The K.S. Hegde Medical Academy, a medical college in Deralakatte and a unit of the Nitte Education Trust, was named after Hegde. The Justice KS Hegde Charitable Foundation, a trust dedicated to the advancement of education and community development in Mangalore, was established in memory of Hegde. Each year, the foundation awards the Justice K.S. Hegde Foundation Awards; previous winners include former Indian prime minister Manmohan Singh.

References

External links
 Former Speaker K. S. Hegde at speakerloksabha.nic.in
Official biographical sketch in Parliament of India website

1909 births
1990 deaths
Speakers of the Lok Sabha
Politicians from Bangalore
Mangaloreans
Tulu people
Deputy Speakers of the Lok Sabha
Rajya Sabha members from Tamil Nadu
Justices of the Supreme Court of India
India MPs 1977–1979
Lok Sabha members from Karnataka
Chief Justices of the Delhi High Court
20th-century Indian judges
Janata Party politicians
Bharatiya Janata Party politicians from Karnataka